Beata pernix is a species of spider in the family Salticidae, found in Brazil.

Taxonomy
Beata pernix was first described by George and Elizabeth Peckham in 1901, as Dendryphantes pernix. It was transferred to the genus Beata by Eugène Simon in 1903.

References

Salticidae
Spiders of Brazil
Spiders described in 1901